Guilt Trips is the first solo studio album by Canadian DJ/producer Ryan Hemsworth. It was released on Last Gang Records on October 22, 2013. Music videos were created for "Against a Wall" and "One for Me". The album won the 2014 Juno Award for Electronic Album of the Year.

Production
Most of the album was recorded on Hemsworth's laptop computer in airports and hotels while he was on tour. It features guest appearances from Sinead Harnett, Lofty305, Baths, Tinashe, Haleek Maul, and Kitty.

Critical reception

At Metacritic, which assigns a weighted average score out of 100 to reviews from mainstream critics, Guilt Trips received an average score of 77, based on 11 reviews, indicating "generally favorable reviews".

David Jeffries of AllMusic gave the album 3.5 stars out of 5, calling it "a soft, serene, and inspired debut." Stephen Carlick of Exclaim! gave the album an 8 out of 10, commenting that "Guilt Trips is as unclassifiable as it is dazzling, a fine debut from an artist who continues to progress." Miles Raymer of Pitchfork gave the album a 7.4 out of 10, saying, "Like his DJ sets, Guilt Trips is all over the place genre-wise, but it never feels dilettantish."

Exclaim! placed the album at number 8 on its year-end list of the "Top 10 Dance & Electronic Albums".

Track listing

References

External links
 
 

2013 albums
Ryan Hemsworth albums
Last Gang Records albums
Juno Award for Electronic Album of the Year albums